Menti may refer to:
 Menți, a village administrated by the town of Strehaia, Romania
 Mentimeter, a company and app from Sweden